The Purified National Party was a break away from Hertzog's National Party which lasted from 1935 to 1948

In 1935 the main portion of the National Party, led by J. B. M. Hertzog, merged with the South African Party of Jan Smuts to form the United Party. A hardline faction of Afrikaner nationalists, led by D. F. Malan, strongly opposed the merger. Malan and 19 other MPs defected to form the Purified National Party, which he led for the next fourteen years in opposition. Their  (Federal Council) met in Bloemfontein to work out their own political program on July 5, 1935. 

In 1939 the question of South African participation in World War II caused a split in the United Party. Hertzog's Nationalist wing broke away and merged with the Purified National Party to form the Reunited (Herenigde) National Party. This party went on to defeat the United Party in the election of 1948.

References

Afrikaner nationalism
Defunct political parties in South Africa
Nationalist parties in South Africa
Protestant political parties